Jon Joel Richardson (born 26 September 1982) is an English comedian. He is known for his appearances on 8 Out of 10 Cats and 8 Out of 10 Cats Does Countdown and his work as co-host with Russell Howard on BBC 6 Music. He is the presenter of Jon Richardson: Ultimate Worrier, and also featured with his wife in the TV show Meet the Richardsons.

Biography
Richardson was born and raised in Lancaster, Lancashire, and attended Ryelands Primary School and Lancaster Royal Grammar School. He left the University of Bristol after taking Hispanic Studies for a year and a half, and subsequently spent some time working as a chef. He then decided to pursue a career in comedy, and lived with fellow comedians Russell Howard, Mark Olver and John Robins for a year in Bristol.

Richardson entered and won his heat of the BBC New Talent Comedy Search in May 2003. He also reached the semi-finals of the Laughing Horse New Act of the Year competition in 2004. Quickly developing throughout 2004, he was one of six acts to reach the final of the J2O Last Laugh Comedy Search. He marked the end of his first year in comedy with a performance at the Criterion Theatre in London's West End. Judges Jasper Carrott and Dave Spikey were both "extremely impressed" with Richardson's performance.

In 2006, Richardson appeared in The Comedy Zone at the Edinburgh Festival. He also completed a 60-date British and Irish tour with Alan Carr, and made an appearance on Paramount's The Comedy Store. In 2007, Spatula Pad (Richardson's first solo show at the Edinburgh Festival Fringe) earned him a Best Newcomer nomination at the Edinburgh Comedy Awards. Richardson won the 2008 Chortle Award for Best Breakthrough Act, and performed Dogmatic (his second solo show) at the Edinburgh Festival Fringe. He later took this show around the country in his first solo tour. He appeared as a team captain in Simon Mayo's 2008 series Act Your Age on BBC Radio 4.

Richardson co-hosted a Sunday morning radio show on BBC Radio 6 Music with fellow comedian and friend Russell Howard, and after Howard left, he continued to present the show himself until 7 March 2010.

In early 2009, Richardson's show This Guy at Night was nominated for the Edinburgh Comedy Awards main prize. That year, he appeared on the BBC music quiz show Never Mind the Buzzcocks. He also appeared on Have I Got News for You in December 2009 and October 2010, and was a guest on David Mitchell's The Bubble.

Richardson appeared on the BBC Radio 5 Live show Fighting Talk in February 2010. He was curator of The Museum of Curiosity for its third series. On 21 March 2010, he presented a BBC Three programme about compulsions and strange habits, entitled Different Like Me. Richardson has performed at comedy festivals in Leeds, Guildford and Bristol, and has headlined university gigs for Off the Kerb and Avalon. He has also compèred in the French Alps, headlined in Barcelona, and performed a one-man show in Greece. In 2010 he also performed at the Melbourne Comedy Festival.

Starting with the 11th series of Channel 4's panel show 8 Out of 10 Cats, Richardson took over from Jason Manford as a team captain. Filming for the series began in June 2011. It's Not Me, It's You!, Richardson's first book, was published during the same month. Later in 2011, he became a regular comic on the Channel 4 show Stand Up for the Week, which was hosted by Kevin Bridges during its second series. Upon Bridges's departure, Richardson took over as host, a role he left after series 4 in 2012. Since January 2012, he has also been a regular on Channel 4's 8 Out of 10 Cats Does Countdown.

Richardson presented a 2012 documentary entitled A Little Bit OCD, in which he studied the lives of people diagnosed with OCD and worried that he might have the same condition; he was indeed revealed to exhibit symptoms of OCD, but did not show signs of the accompanying dysfunction. The show won the 2013 Mind Award in the documentary category.

On 19 November 2012, Richardson released his first stand up DVD, Funny Magnet. The performance was recorded at the Apollo Theatre in Hammersmith on 9 September 2012. The DVD also features Richardson's set from Live at the Apollo and audio commentary with his housemate, comedian Matt Forde.

In December 2012, Channel 4 broadcast The Real Man's Road Trip: Sean & Jon Go West, a two-part series in which Richardson and his 8 Out of 10 Cats colleague Sean Lock travelled to Louisiana to experience the local culture and lifestyle. The show was filmed in September 2012.

Richardson began Work in Progress shows in late 2013, and in 2014 took his new show Nidiot on the road culminating in a DVD of the same name. In August 2013 he headlined the comedy stage at the V Festival.

Appearing on Radio 5's Fighting Talk on 11 January 2014, Richardson said his worst ever gig was a couple of months previously at Doncaster Dome. He claimed the initial smattering of applause quickly reduced through his time on stage.

Richardson has presented two series of the Dave panel show Jon Richardson: Ultimate Worrier, in which he and his guests discuss their worries.

In 2020, Richardson appeared in the mockumentary sitcom Meet the Richardsons for UKTV's Dave and presented Channel Hopping With Jon Richardson on Comedy Central. The former is a documentary-style sitcom co-written and co-starring Richardson's wife Lucy Beaumont, with Lucy having to deal with an exaggerated version of Richardson's character, whilst the latter is a weird TV clips show in the style of Clive James on Television, but with Richardson presenting and two other guests discussing the clips each week. In 2020 Richardson also launched the podcast Jon Richardson and the Futurenauts with co-hosts Mark Stevenson and Ed Gillespie to discuss systemic societal problems and their solutions. The podcast has received overwhelming positive reviews. The Arts Desk remarked "without making light of [the subject matter], Richardson and Co find the funny."

In January 2023, Richardson and Beaumont launched Jon & Lucy's Odd Couples - a panel show featuring celebrity couples answering questions about their private lives and performing various tasks to test their relationships. The show was first announced in 2022 with an order of 6 hour-long episodes.

Personal life
Richardson lived in Swindon for seven years, then in Surbiton, London, with fellow comedians Matt Forde and Danny Buckler. He also lived with comedians John Robins and Russell Howard. In a 2012 interview with Woman magazine, he mentioned he had bought a house in the Lake District for his mother. He is a vegan and supporter of Leeds United. In July 2019 Richardson mentioned on BBC1's Saturday Kitchen Live that he had moved across to West Yorkshire, Calder Valley, from Lancashire.

Richardson married comedian Lucy Beaumont in April 2015; the pair were introduced by mutual friend Roisin Conaty and dated for about two years prior to marriage. Their first child, a daughter named Elsie Louise, was born in September 2016.

Richardson has explored whether he has OCD, concluding that he instead has obsessive-compulsive personality disorder; this was the subject of his Edinburgh Festival Fringe show Spatula Pad. In 2018, Richardson told Radio Times that he had been to counselling for six months, calling it "an immensely positive step". Saying "I wish I'd done it sooner", Richardson said "acknowledging there's a problem is the best thing" and recommended counselling to "anyone who's even mildly upset about anything".

Filmography

Television and radio

Stand-up DVDs

Edinburgh Festival Fringe credits

References

External links

2010 personal column in The Guardian

1982 births
Living people
Alumni of the University of Bristol
English radio DJs
Comedians from Lancashire
English male comedians
English male writers
English satirists
English stand-up comedians
People educated at Lancaster Royal Grammar School
People from Lancaster, Lancashire
People with obsessive-compulsive personality disorder
21st-century English comedians